The UNESCO World Heritage Site known as the Defence Line of Amsterdam (in Dutch named Stelling van Amsterdam) is a  ring of fortifications around Amsterdam. Any buildings within  of the line had to be made of wood so that they could be burnt and the obstruction removed.

The Stelling van Amsterdam was constructed between 1880 and 1920. The invention of the aeroplane and tank made the forts obsolete almost as soon as they were finished. Many of the forts now are under the control of both the town councils and the nature department. They may be visited by the public, and admission is free on Monuments Day, the second Saturday in September.

Function
The Stelling van Amsterdam was primarily a defensive water line (Dutch: waterlinie). In the event of an enemy attack, large tracts of land around Amsterdam would be inundated with water, preventing the enemy from advancing. Amsterdam would function as a national redoubt or reduit, as the last stronghold of the Netherlands. Forts were built in which roads, railways or dikes crossed through the water line. At such locations, there would be no water to stop the enemy and so the forts were intended to shell the enemy.

Construction
The law for the construction of the Stelling van Amsterdam was passed in 1874, a few years after the Unification of Germany, which placed a powerful new great power on the eastern border of the Netherlands. During the planning prior to its construction, the design was already obviously outdated by modern technical advances. The invention of the high-explosive shell and the percussion fuze, which allowed ordnance to explode on impact and dislodge brick fortifications easily, necessitated a change from masonry to concrete forts. The Dutch did not have the required experience yet using and building with concrete and so extensive tests had to be performed. Concrete structures were shelled with the heaviest artillery available at that time. Further delays resulted from the fact that the sand foundations had to settle for several years before the forts could be built on them. Only in 1897 could the actual construction finally begin.

Service
The Stelling van Amsterdam has never seen combat service and the use of aircraft rendered it obsolete after World War I. It was, however, maintained and kept in service until it was decommissioned in 1963.

The dike through the Haarlemmermeer, which made it possible to flood the southern portion of the polder while the northern portion could continue to produce food for Amsterdam, is now cut by the A4 motorway. The motorway also goes under the Ringvaart at Roelofarendsveen, which makes the flooding of the Haarlemmermeer Polder and thus the future use of the Stelling no longer possible.

In 1996, the complete Stelling was designated as a UNESCO World Heritage Site.

List of forts

North front
 Fort near Edam
 Fort near Kwadijk
 Fort North of Purmerend
 Fort along Nekkerweg
 Fort along Middenweg
 Fort along Jisperweg
 Fort near Spijkerboor

Northwest front
 Fort near Marken-Binnen
 Fort near Krommeniedijk
 Fort along Den Ham
 Fort near Veldhuis
 Fort along the St. Aagtendijk
 Fort in the Zuidwijkermeerpolder
 Fort near Velsen
 Coastal Fort near IJmuiden

West front
 Fort North of Spaarndam
 Fort South of Spaarndam
 Fort near Penningsveer
 Fort near the Liebrug
 Fort along the Liede

Southwest front
 Fort near Vijfhuizen
 Battery along IJweg
 Fort near Hoofddorp
 Battery along Sloterweg
 Fort near Aalsmeer

South front
 Fort near Kudelstaart
 Fort near De Kwakel
 Fort along the Drecht
 Fort near Uithoorn
 Fort Waver-Amstel
 Fort in the Waver-Botshol
 Fort along the Winkel

Southeast front
 Fort near Abcoude
 Batteries along the Gein
 Fort near Nigtevecht
 Fort near Hinderdam
 Fort Uitermeer
 Weesp Fortress

Zuiderzee front
 Muiden Fortress
 Battery near Diemerdam
 Fort Pampus
 Batterij near Durgerdam (Vuurtoreneiland)

See also

Dutch waterlines
Old / New Dutch Waterline
Grebbe line
IJssel Line
Maas Line
Peel-Raam Line

Other
Defence lines of the Netherlands

References

External links
 Website of the Defence Line of Amsterdam
 Website about the Defence Line of Amsterdam 
 Virtual Tour 
Visit site in 360° panophotography

 
World Heritage Sites in the Netherlands
Buildings and structures in North Holland
19th century in Amsterdam
20th century in Amsterdam
Forts in the Netherlands
Tourist attractions in North Holland
National redoubts